Johann Karl Eugen Trausch von Trauschenfels was a Transylvanian publicist of The House of Trausch von Trauschenfels.

He was born in 1833, in Kronstadt (current-day Brașov, Romania) and died in 1903, in the same city.

1833 births
1903 deaths
People from Brașov
Transylvanian Saxon people
Members of the Austrian House of Deputies (1861–1867)
19th-century Hungarian historians
Hungarian jurists
Austrian jurists
19th-century Austrian historians
Opinion journalists
Hungarian columnists